Cian Darcy (born 23 April 1998) is a hurler who plays as a forward for the Tipperary senior team. He plays his club hurling with  Kilruane MacDonagh's.

Career
Darcy made his senior debut for the Tipperary hurling team on 3 February 2018 in the second round of the 2018 National Hurling League against Waterford when he came on as a substitute in the second half.

Honours
Tipperary
All-Ireland Under-21 Hurling Championship (1): 2018
All-Ireland Minor Hurling Championship (1): 2016
Munster Minor Hurling Championship (2):2015, 2016

Kilruane MacDonagh's
Tipperary Senior Hurling Championship: 2022

References

Living people
Kilruane MacDonaghs hurlers
Tipperary inter-county hurlers
1998 births